Schlosshöfe is a shopping mall in the centre of the city of Oldenburg, Lower Saxony, Germany.

The shopping mall is 12,500m2 in area and opened in 2011. Schlosshöfe is located to the north of Schlossplatz. To the south is Schloss Oldenburg and to the west is St Lamberti-Kirche.
The owner of the Schlosshöfe is ECE Projektmanagement GmbH. The company invested 115 million euros in the project. The sales area is around 12,500 square meters. The center has 80 stores and a total of 450 employees. The total catchment area has 809,455 inhabitants.

See also
 List of shopping malls in Germany
 List of visitor attractions in Oldenburg

References

External links

 Schlosshöfe Oldenburg website
 

2011 establishments in Germany
Shopping malls established in 2011
Buildings and structures in Oldenburg (city)
Tourist attractions in Oldenburg (city)
Shopping malls in Germany